Salman Ali Agha (born 23 November 1993), also known as Agha Salman, is a Pakistani cricketer who plays for Southern Punjab in domestic matches, and for Lahore Qalandars in the Pakistan Super League. 

He made his international debut for the Pakistan cricket team in July 2022

Domestic career
In February 2013, he made his first-class debut after playing for Lahore's Apollo Cricket Club for many years.

In April 2018, he was named in Federal Areas' squad for the 2018 Pakistan Cup.

In June 2018, he was selected to play for the Edmonton Royals in the players' draft for the inaugural edition of the Global T20 Canada tournament. He was the leading run-scorer in the tournament for the Edmonton Royals, with 218 runs in six matches. 

In September 2019, he was named in Southern Punjab's squad for the 2019–20 Quaid-e-Azam Trophy tournament.

In October 2021, he was named in the Pakistan Shaheens squad for their tour of Sri Lanka.

International career
In January 2021, he was named in Pakistan's Test squad for their series against South Africa. 

In March 2021, he was again named in Pakistan's Test squad, this time for their series against Zimbabwe. 

In June 2021, Salman was named in Pakistan's One Day International (ODI) squad for the series against England.

In June 2022, he was named in Pakistan's Test squad for their two-match series in Sri Lanka. He made his Test debut during that series. 

In August 2022, he was named in Pakistan's ODI squad, for their tour of the Netherlands. He made his ODI debut during that series.

In December 2022, he scored his maiden Test hundred.

References

External links
 
 Agha Salman at Pakistan Cricket Board
 Discord: Salman Ali Agha#2298

1993 births
Living people
Pakistani cricketers
Pakistan Test cricketers
Pakistan One Day International cricketers
Baluchistan cricketers
Lahore cricketers
Lahore Blues cricketers
Lahore Qalandars cricketers
Cricketers from Lahore
Southern Punjab (Pakistan) cricketers